Preptothauma is a monotypic moth genus in the family Eupterotidae. Its only species, Preptothauma oxydiata, is found in Colombia. Both the genus and species were described by Max Wilhelm Karl Draudt in 1931.

References

Moths described in 1931
Eupterotinae